Son Bong-gak (born 25 March 1974) is a South Korean equestrian. He competed in two events at the 2004 Summer Olympics.

References

1974 births
Living people
South Korean male equestrians
Olympic equestrians of South Korea
Equestrians at the 2004 Summer Olympics
Place of birth missing (living people)
Asian Games medalists in equestrian
Equestrians at the 1998 Asian Games
Equestrians at the 2006 Asian Games
Equestrians at the 2010 Asian Games
Equestrians at the 2018 Asian Games
Asian Games silver medalists for South Korea
Medalists at the 1998 Asian Games